The Public Sector Management Program in Australia is a cooperative tertiary management learning approach used by the State and Territory Governments in cooperation with the Australian Federal Government.

The PSMP is a four-module management training program undertaken by Public Service Managers who come from either Local, State or Federal Public Service positions.  It is managed within each Australian State and the final qualification earned was a Graduate Certificate in Public Sector Management from Flinders University, SA.  The course was organised by the Queensland University of Technology (QUT) from 2011 to 2014 and QUT has been given the right to run the course again from 2015 to 2019.

Graduates of the PSMP are eligible for credit into further post-graduate programs at the Graduate Diploma, Masters, Masters (Honours) and Doctorate level.

References
 http://www.ttc.tas.gov.au/additional_programs/psmp
 https://www.forgov.qld.gov.au/public-sector-management-program
 https://www.psc.nsw.gov.au/workforce-management/performance-development/leadership-development-courses/public-sector-management-program
 https://www.qut.edu.au/study/courses/graduate-certificate-in-business-public-sector-management
 https://ocpe.nt.gov.au/nt-public-sector-employment/training-and-events/leadership-programs/public-sector-management-program
 http://education.qld.gov.au/staff/development/employee/public-sector-mgmt-program.html
 https://unwomen.org.au/two-scholarships-for-the-public-sector-management-program-psmp-available-from-the-qut-business-school-for-ngo-women/
 https://www.nsw.ipaa.org.au/psmp-award
 http://www.apsc.gov.au/publications-and-media/speeches/2015/queensland-university-of-technology-business-school-public-sector-management-program-graduation-keynote-address
 https://www.ncoss.org.au/news-and-events/community-sector-news/public-sector-management-program-ngo-scholarship-overview

External links
PSM Program Website - National
PSM Program Website - SA Division

Government of Australia
Public sector in Australia